Imeglimin (brand name Twymeeg) is an oral anti-diabetic medication.  It was approved for use in Japan in June 2021.

It is an oxidative phosphorylation blocker that acts to inhibit hepatic gluconeogenesis, increase muscle glucose uptake, and restore normal insulin secretion. It is the first approved drug of this class of anti-diabetic medication.

References 

Anti-diabetic drugs